Markus Rühl (born 22 February 1972, in Darmstadt, Germany) is a retired IFBB professional bodybuilder. Rühl began training at the age of 19 following a doctor's recommendation after sustaining a knee injury while playing football. At , Rühl began training hard six days a week until deciding to compete on a professional level five years later. During this period he worked as a used-car salesman. Rühl signed a sponsorship deal with Ultimate Nutrition in late 2008. In 2018 he started his own supplement company, Rühl's Bestes.

Legacy
Although Rühl only won two shows in his career, he is considered to be one of the biggest "mass monster" bodybuilders who ever lived.

Stats (active peak numbers)
Height: 
Arm Size:  (contest)
Leg Size:  (contest)
Waist Size: 
Chest size:

Competitive record
 The Bachgau Cup
 2010  IFBB Europa Super Show - 7th
 2009 Mr. Olympia - 15th
 2009 New York Pro - 3rd
 2006 IFBB Austria Pro Grand Prix - 3rd
 2006 Mr. Olympia - 8th
 2005 Mr. Olympia - 15th
 2004 Mr. Olympia - 5th
 2003 Arnold Classic - 3rd
 2002 Mr. Olympia - 8th
 2002 Night of Champions - 1st
 2002 Toronto Pro Classic - 2nd
 2001 Mr. Olympia - 14th
 2000 Mr. Olympia - 7th
 2000 Joe Weider's World Pro Cup - 5th
 2000 Grand Prix England - 5th
 2000 Night of Champions - 2nd
 2000 Toronto Pro - 1st
 1999 Grand Prix England - 7th
 1999 Joe Weider's Pro World - 7th
 1999 Night of Champions - 4th
 1999 Mr. Olympia - Disqualified

Training movies

XXXL-Big beyond belief - 2000
Made in Germany - 2004
Big and loving it - 2007
Ruhling 4 Ever - 2010

See also 
List of female professional bodybuilders
List of male professional bodybuilders

Notes

References

External links 
 Markus Rühl's website
 Markus Rühl's old website
 Video Clip of Markus Rühl posing at the 2006 Mr. Olympia contest
 Markus Ruhl Bodybuilding Gallery

1972 births
Living people
German bodybuilders
Professional bodybuilders
Sportspeople from Darmstadt